Guillermo Andrés Duró (born 16 November 1968) is an Argentine football manager and former player who played as a defender. He is the current manager of Ecuadorian side Delfín.

Career
Born in Villa Ballester, Duró represented San Miguel, Ituzaingó, Almirante Brown and Aldosivi as a player. He began his managerial career in 2000, with Defensores de Belgrano.

After leaving Defensores in 2002, Duró subsequently worked with Platense before joining Julio Asad's staff at Deportivo Cuenca, as his assistant. He returned to Argentina in 2005 with All Boys, and subsequently worked at Flandria and Tristán Suárez before moving back to Deportivo Cuenca in November 2008, now as manager.

Duró left Cuenca in December 2009 after his contract expired, and was named in charge of Independiente del Valle in May 2010. He was sacked after nearly four months in charge, and subsequently returned to Argentina to take over Temperley in June 2011.

Duró returned to Defensores de Belgrano in February 2012, but left on 25 October to return to Deportivo Cuenca. He returned to Tristán Suárez as a football coordinator in June 2013, and after a short spell at Libertad de Sunchales, he returned to Deportivo Cuenca on 13 March 2014.

On 8 March 2016, Duró was appointed at the helm of Estudiantes de Buenos Aires. He was subsequently in charge of Atlanta and Deportivo Riestra before returning to Cuenca for a fourth spell, initially as an interim.

After working at Cuenca as a sporting director, Duró returned to managerial duties in August 2021, after being again named in charge of Riestra. He left the club on 13 June of the following year, before returning to Ecuador on 31 August to take over Delfín.

References

External links

1969 births
Living people
People from General San Martín Partido
Sportspeople from Buenos Aires Province
Argentine footballers
Association football defenders
Club Atlético San Miguel footballers
Club Atlético Ituzaingó players
Club Almirante Brown footballers
Aldosivi footballers
Argentine football managers
Defensores de Belgrano managers
Club Atlético Platense managers
All Boys managers
Club Atlético Atlanta managers
C.D. Cuenca managers
C.S.D. Independiente del Valle managers
Delfín S.C. managers
Argentine expatriate football managers
Argentine expatriate sportspeople in Ecuador
Expatriate football managers in Ecuador